Sunniva Næs Andersen (born 12 November 1996) is a Norwegian handball player who currently plays for Vipers Kristiansand.

She also represented Norway at the 2016 Women's Junior World Handball Championship, placing 5th.

Achievements
European Championship:
Winner: 2022
EHF Champions League:
Winner: 2020/2021, 2021/2022
Bronze medalist: 2018/2019
EHF Cup: 
Finalist: 2018
Norwegian League:
Winner: 2017/2018, 2018/2019, 2019/2020, 2020/2021, 2021/2022
Norwegian Cup:
Winner: 2017, 2018, 2019, 2020, 2021, 2022/23

References

Norwegian female handball players
1996 births
Sportspeople from Skien
Living people